Veronica Jo Merrell-Burriss and Vanessa Jo Merrell (born August 6, 1996), known as the Merrell Twins, are American identical twin YouTubers, actresses, musicians and singers.

Early years
The Merrell Twins are identical twin sisters born in Kansas City, Missouri, on August 6, 1996, to Paul Merrell and Wendy Merrell. Veronica "Roni" is 45 minutes older than Vanessa "Nessa". They grew up in Kansas City, Missouri, before moving to Greater Los Angeles in June 2013 at the age of 16 to pursue a career in acting and filming for their YouTube channel.  They also had a very short time with Disney Channel.

Education
In 2015, the Merrell Twins enrolled in California State University, Northridge. Veronica was studying screenwriting and Vanessa was studying TV production.

Career
The Merrell Twins started making YouTube videos in 2009. Their videos are produced and edited by their father, Paul Merrell. They often appear in AwesomenessTV videos and had recurring roles on the television show Jane the Virgin. They appeared in the 2016 film The Standoff. In 2016 at the 8th Shorty Awards, they won for YouNower of the Year.

They won a Streamy Award for Best Live Social Media in 2016. In 2017, they were nominated for Choice Female Web Star at the Teen Choice Awards. In 2018, they were nominated for two Teen Choice Awards: Choice Female Web Star and Choice YouTuber. They won the 2018 Streamy Award in the Lifestyle category. 

In July 2018, the Merrell Twins released their clothing line, True IMG. The phrase 'true image' is derived from the meaning of Veronica's name, and its logo features a butterfly dotting the 'I' in IMG referring to the meaning of Vanessa's name in Greek.

They were nominated in 2019 for Best YouTube Ensemble at the 11th Shorty Awards. At the 2020 Kids' Choice Awards, they were nominated for Favorite Female Social Star.

In collaboration with AwesomenessTV, the twins launched Twin My Heart, a reality TV show aimed at finding love for one of the twins, Vanessa Merrell. The success of season one led to a second season being released in 2020 which revolved around two of the twins' best friends, Franny Arrieta and Nezza. They also produced and acted in three web shows called "Where is My Romeo?", "Prom Knight", and "Breaking into College".

In the beginning of 2023, Vanessa and her husband John Vaughn, formed a music duo "ButterflyTiger" and released their debut single, "Love Me (Like You Do)" on February 24, 2023.

Personal lives
On December 27, 2021, Veronica married YouTuber Aaron Burriss.

On January 27, 2023, Vanessa married musician John Vaughn.

Filmography
 This filmography is of the twins as a duo.

 This filmography is of Vanessa Merrell.

Awards and nominations

References

External links

1996 births
21st-century American actresses
Actresses from Kansas City, Missouri
People from Kansas City, Missouri
American web series actresses
American YouTubers
Identical twin actresses
Lifestyle YouTubers
Living people
Streamy Award winners
Twin musical duos
Identical twin females
Female musical duos
Shorty Award winners